Rajčica is a village in the municipality of Debar, North Macedonia.

Demographics
As of the 2021 census, Rajčica had 162 residents with the following ethnic composition:
Albanians 70
Macedonians 56
Turks 16
Others (including Torbeš) 12
Persons for whom data are taken from administrative sources 8

According to the 2002 census, the village had a total of 131 inhabitants. Ethnic groups in the village include:
Albanians 72
Macedonians 42
Turks 1
Others 16

References

External links

Villages in Debar Municipality
Albanian communities in North Macedonia